National Cycle Network (NCN) Route 70 is a Sustrans National Route that runs from Walney Island in Cumbria to Sunderland. The route is fully open and signed.

History
Route 70 is the original route of the W2W challenge route which was launched on 1 June 2005. When launched the route used sections of NCN Routes 72, 68 and 71 west of the Pennines. From Tan Hill to Sunderland a new Regional Route was created and given the number 20, with a blue background. In 2012, after improvements to meet National Cycle Network standards, it was upgrade to Route 70. Route signs were changed to the number 70 with a red background. Around the same time the sections on the route that had previously been Route 71 and 72 were re-signed as Route 70.

Route

Walney to Oxenholme
From Walney Island in the Irish Sea  it goes on to the industrial port of Barrow-in-Furness. It then runs through the Furness peninsula, passing the towns of Ulverston and the picturesque Grange-Over-Sands where the route follows the Promenade. The route continues to skirt the Lake District national park to Oxenholme, with a short branch from there to the historical market town of Kendal

Oxenholme to Barnard Castle
On reaching the Lune Valley the route joins the Pennine Cycleway (Route 68) and is signed accordingly from there for the  miles to Asby. After this, the path continues as Route 70 moving in an easterly direction towards Kirkby Stephen and through the Pennines to Barnard Castle in County Durham. The highest point on the route is at Tan Hill, .

Barnard Castle to Sunderland
Continuing through Hamsterley, to reach the beautiful cathedral city of Durham. Regional  Route 715 between Barnard Castle and Willington is an alternative W2W route, it is  shorter and an easier ride via Bishop Auckland. From Durham the route joins  Route 14 for  until Sherburn from where it continues is via Hetton Lyons Park to its eastern trailhead at Silksworth, Sunderland where it meets  Route 1.

Related NCN routes 
Route 70 meets the following routes:
  Route 700 at Barrow in Furness, Ulverston, Cartmel, Grange-over-Sands and Levens
  Route 6 at Crosscrake and Natland
  Route 68 at Lowgill  and Asby
  Route 71 at Tan Hill 
  Route 165 at Barnard Castle
  Route 715 at Willington
  Route 14 at Durham and Sherburn
  Route 1 at Sunderland

Route 70 is part of the W2W along with:

Route 70 is part of the Bay Cycle Way along with:

Footnotes

External links

Route 70 on the Sustrans web site
The official website of the W2W
Wearside Sustrans website with links to details on the route in Wearside

Cycleways in England
National Cycle Routes